The Isaac Melvin House is a historic house at 19 Centre Street in Cambridge, Massachusetts.  This -story Greek Revival-Italianate house was built in 1842 by Oliver Wood and Isaac Melvin as the latter's home.  Melvin is also notable for designing the North Avenue Congregational Church.  Despite an Italianate T-shaped massing, the building's front facade is strongly Greek Revival, with 4 two-story pilasters supporting an entablature and topped by the fully pedimented gable end of the roof.  The tympanum of the pediment has an Italianate round-arch window in it.

The house was listed on the National Register of Historic Places in 1982.

See also
National Register of Historic Places listings in Cambridge, Massachusetts

References

Houses on the National Register of Historic Places in Cambridge, Massachusetts